Mário Donizete Oliveira Ferreira, known as Marinho Donizete, (born July 31, 1980), is a Brazilian defender who currently plays for Sergipe.

Honours 
 Vila Nova
 Campeonato Goiano Série B: 2015
 Campeonato Brasileiro Série C: 2015

References

1980 births
Brazilian footballers
Living people
People from Uberlândia
Campeonato Brasileiro Série A players
Campeonato Brasileiro Série B players
Campeonato Brasileiro Série C players
Uberlândia Esporte Clube players
Ipatinga Futebol Clube players
Boa Esporte Clube players
Criciúma Esporte Clube players
Red Bull Brasil players
Fortaleza Esporte Clube players
Vila Nova Futebol Clube players
Anápolis Futebol Clube players
União Recreativa dos Trabalhadores players
Club Sportivo Sergipe players
Association football fullbacks
Sportspeople from Minas Gerais